The Click was  a hip hop group consisting of 4 members from Vallejo, California. The group's members are E-40 (Earl Stevens), his cousin B-Legit (Brandt Jones), his brother D-Shot (Danell Stevens), and his sister Suga-T (Tanina Stevens). Together the group has released three studio albums. In 2018, the group reunited on the E-40 and B-Legit collaboration album, Connected and Respected, on the song, "Blame It".

Discography

Studio albums

Compilation albums
The Best of The Click (2003)

Extended plays
Let's Side (1990)

Soundtrack appearances

References

External links 
 [ The Click] at Allmusic
 The Click at Discogs
 M.V.P. at Discogs

Hip hop groups from California
Family musical groups
Jive Records artists
Musical groups established in 1988
Musical groups disestablished in 2001
Musical groups from the San Francisco Bay Area
Musicians from Vallejo, California
Gangsta rap groups
African-American musical groups
Musical quartets